Lukas Kleckers (born 18 May 1996 in Essen, North Rhine-Westphalia) is a German professional snooker player.

Career 
Kleckers first drew attention in 2013 when, at the age of 17, he captured the highest ranking and most prestigious amateur event in Germany by defeating Roman Dietzel 4–2 in the final of the German Amateur Championship. In the next few years he twice played in the qualifying rounds for the World Championship, losing 10–6 to Noppon Saengkham in 2015 and 10–7 to Rory McLeod in 2016. At the 2015 Riga Open he won a match in a European Tour event for the first time by beating Anthony Hamilton 4–0, before losing 4–0 to Stephen Maguire.

In May 2017, Kleckers came through Q-School by winning six matches including victories over former professionals Adrian Rosa and Martin O'Donnell to earn a two-year card on the World Snooker Tour for the 2017–18 and 2018–19 seasons.

Performance and rankings timeline

Career finals

Pro-am finals: 1 (1 title)

Amateur finals: 15 (11 titles)

References

External links 

 Official Website
 Lukas Kleckers at worldsnooker.com
 Lukas Kleckers at CueTracker.net: Snooker Results and Statistic Database

German snooker players
Living people
1996 births
Sportspeople from Essen